David or Dave Thompson may refer to:

Business
 David Thompson (American businessman, born 1798) (1798–1871), president of New York Life Insurance & Trust Company
 David Thompson (British businessman) (1936–2021), co-founder of Hillsdown Holdings
 G. David Thompson (1899–1965), American investment banker, industrialist, and modern art collector

Entertainment
 Dave Thompson (author) (born 1960), British author, largely dealing with rock and pop music
 Dave Thompson (comedian) (born 1959), British actor and comedian
 David M. Thompson (born 1950), founder of BBC Films
 David Thompson (singer) (1950–2010), lead singer of the Canadian country band Thunder Road
 David Thompson (writer), American writer and playwright
 David W. Thompson (born 1994), American actor
 Lil' Dave Thompson (1969–2010), American electric blues guitarist, singer and songwriter
 A pen name for David L. Robbins (born 1950)

Law
 David R. Thompson (1930–2011), U.S. federal judge
 David N. Thompson (1859–1945), Justice of the Louisiana Supreme Court 
 David Thompson (attorney), American trial attorney
 Sir Dave Thompson (police officer), Chief Constable of West Midlands Police

Politics 
David Thompson (Canada West politician) (1793–1851), entrepreneur and political figure in Canada West
David P. Thompson (1834–1901), governor of the Idaho Territory, mayor of Portland, Oregon
David E. Thompson (1854–1942), American diplomat
David Thompson (Canadian politician) (1836–1886), member of the Canadian House of Commons
Dave Thompson (Scottish politician) (born 1949), Scottish National Party member of the Scottish Parliament for Skye, Lochaber and Badenoch
Dave Thompson (Minnesota politician) (born 1961), Minnesota state senator
David Thompson (Barbadian politician) (1961–2010), Prime Minister of Barbados

Sports

Football and rugby
David Thompson (footballer, born 1962), former English football player with Rochdale, Notts County, Wigan, Preston and Chester
David Thompson (footballer, born 1968), English former professional footballer
David Thompson (footballer, born 1977), former English football player with Liverpool, Coventry, Blackburn, Wigan, Portsmouth and Bolton
Dave Thompson (footballer, born 1945), English former professional footballer
Dave Thompson (American football) (born 1949), American football player
David Thompson (American football) (born 1975), American football player
David Thompson (rugby league, born 1978), Australian rugby league player
Dave Thompson (rugby league, born 1995), for Leigh Centurions

Other sports
David Thompson (basketball) (born 1954), American basketball player
David Thompson (cricketer) (born 1976), former English cricketer
David Thompson (baseball) (born 1993), American baseball player

Other fields
 David B. Thompson (1923–2013), American prelate of the Roman Catholic Church
 David D. Thompson, U.S. Space Force general
 David Thompson (New Hampshire settler) (1593–?), founder of the first European settlement in New Hampshire
 David Thompson (explorer) (1770–1857), Canadian explorer
 David Thompson (chef), Australian chef
 David Thompson (nurse) (born 1955), British academic nurse and psychologist

See also 
David Thompson Highway, named for the explorer of Canada
David Thomson (disambiguation)